The Council on Affordable Housing (COAH) is a defunct agency of the Government of New Jersey within the New Jersey Department of Community Affairs that was responsible for ensuring that all 566 New Jersey municipalities provided their fair share of low and moderate income housing.

The COAH was created by the New Jersey Legislature in response to the Fair Housing Act of 1985 and a series of New Jersey Supreme Court rulings that are known as the Mount Laurel doctrine.

History
The council was made up of 12 members appointed by the Governor of New Jersey and approved by the New Jersey Senate. COAH defined housing regions, estimated the needs for low/moderate income housing, allocated fair share numbers by municipality and reviewed plans to fulfill these obligations.

As of January 2006, 287 of New Jersey's 566 municipalities were part of the COAH process, and another 78 were under the court's jurisdiction. There were at least two COAH municipalities in each of the state's 21 counties. Bergen County had 42 of its 70 municipalities involved, the highest number in the state, with Morris County's 29 municipalities ranking second.

Municipalities originally were allowed to enter into a Regional Contribution Agreement (RCA), which allows them to pay a fee to another municipality that agrees to provide affordable housing units to fulfill up to half of the sending municipality's COAH obligations. The sending municipality must pay a negotiated fee for each unit transferred. For example, Marlboro Township signed an agreement in June 2008 that will have Trenton build or rehabilitate 332 housing units (out of Marlboro's 1,600-unit obligation), with Marlboro paying $25,000 per unit, a total of $8.3 million to Trenton for taking on the responsibility for these units.

RCAs were suppressed by the state's housing laws on July 17, 2008.

COAH's defunct status as of 2017
On March 10, 2015, the New Jersey Supreme Court divested COAH of jurisdiction of municipal housing plans. Towns must now petition the lower court for approval of their housing plans. Builders, developers and other interested parties may intervene in such proceedings, which are known as declaratory judgment actions.

On February 9, 2010, Governor Chris Christie had suspended COAH and appointed a committee in preparation to dismantle it. The Supreme Court ruled that it was not within his power "“to abolish independent agencies that were created by legislative action”. It also ordered COAH to come up with new regulations regarding the development of affordable housing. COAH passed new guidelines on May 1, 2014, which increase the number of units developers are permitted to build in exchange for one affordable housing unit from four to nine. When asked, the agency refused to provide the contract for the Rutgers University professor who prepared the plan and claimed that the documents used to calculate the new guidelines had been lost, leading an affordable housing group to offer a $1,000 reward. In July 2014, a superior judge ruled that the contract must be released and search conducting for the missing documents.

In October 2014 the COAH Board failed to meet the deadline by the Supreme Court for establishing new Third Round guidelines, when the board voted, 3–3, to adopt the proposal. In the absence of action by the state, the New Jersey Supreme Court ruled in March 2015, that determination of affordable housing obligations would be administered by the court.

References

External links
 End Christie's defiance of the Supreme Court: Editorial
 Courts' procedures coming into focus as New Jersey's affordable housing saga continues
 Proposed rules April 30, 2014
 

State agencies of New Jersey
Government agencies established in 1985
Affordable housing
1985 establishments in New Jersey